Silk and Salt Melodies is a jazz studio album by French musician Louis Sclavis with Benjamin Moussay, Gilles Coronado and Keyvan Chemirani under the name Louis Sclavis Quartet. This jazz album was released in ECM Records label in August 2014.

Reception
Karl Ackermann in All About Jazz gave a four and a half stars to this album and says that "Putting Silk and Salt Melodies in the context of Sclavis' larger body of work is somewhat irrelevant; he builds, incorporates and moves on. It's a good philosophy for listening as well."In The Guardian, John Fordham gave this album four stars and says that "The Frenchman [Louis Sclavis] is one of the most consistently satisfying, yet surprising jazz-driven composer-players in Europe" and that "The playing is terrific, but – as so often with Sclavis – the themes are even better.".

Track listing
ECM – ECM 2402.

Personnel
Louis Sclavis – clarinet
Gilles Coronado – guitar
Benjamin Moussay – piano, keyboard
Keyvan Chemirani – percussion

References

ECM Records albums
2014 albums
Albums produced by Manfred Eicher